Leonard House may refer to:

in the United States
(by state then city)
Leonard-Akin House, in Vienna, Georgia, listed on the National Register of Historic Places (NRHP) in Dooly County
Clifford Milton Leonard Farm, in Lake Forest, Illinois, listed on the NRHP in Lake County
 Leonard House (Greensboro, Maryland), NRHP-listed in Caroline County
Capt. Charles Leonard House, in Agawam, Massachusetts, NRHP-listed
James Leonard House, in Taunton, Massachusetts, NRHP-listed
Chauncey B. Leonard House, in Berlin, Vermont, listed on the NRHP in Washington County
William Ellery Leonard House, in Madison, Wisconsin, listed on the NRHP in Dane County